The characters from the American drama television series Lost were created by Damon Lindelof and J. J. Abrams. The series follows the lives of plane crash survivors on a mysterious tropical island, after a commercial passenger jet from the fictional Oceanic Airlines crashes somewhere in the South Pacific. Each episode typically  features a primary storyline on the island as well as a secondary storyline, a flashback from another point in a character's life.

Out of the 324 people on board Oceanic Flight 815, there are 71 initial survivors (70 humans and one dog) spread across the three sections of the plane crash.

Casting and development
Many of the first season roles were a result of the executive producers' liking of various actors. The main character Jack was originally going to die in the pilot, and was hoped to be played by Michael Keaton; however, ABC executives were adamant that Jack live. Before it was decided that Jack would live, Kate was to emerge as the leader of the survivors; she was originally conceived to be more like the character of Rose. Dominic Monaghan auditioned for the role of Sawyer, who at the time was supposed to be a suit-wearing city con man. The producers enjoyed Monaghan's performance and changed the character of Charlie, originally a middle-aged former rock star, to fit him. Jorge Garcia also auditioned for Sawyer, and the part of Hurley was written for him. When Josh Holloway auditioned for Sawyer, the producers liked the edge he brought to the character (he reportedly kicked a chair when he forgot his lines and got angry in the audition) and his southern accent, so they changed Sawyer to fit Holloway's acting. Yunjin Kim auditioned for Kate, but the producers wrote the character of Sun for her and the character of Jin, portrayed by Daniel Dae Kim, to be her husband. Sayid, played by Naveen Andrews, was also not in the original script. Locke and Michael were written with their actors in mind. Emilie de Ravin, who plays Claire, was originally cast in what was supposed to be a recurring role. Kimberley Joseph's character, an unnamed flight attendant, was originally scripted to be killed off in the pilot, but was brought back in Season 2 with the name Cindy and continued to make guest appearances through to the final season, becoming one of the last handful of Flight 815 survivors.

Cast

Main cast

Recurring cast

Main characters
Characters are listed alphabetically. "Starring season(s)" refers to the season in which an actor or actress received star billing for playing a character. "Recurring season(s)" identifies a season in which an actor or actress appeared, but received guest star or special guest star billing.

Supporting characters

Minor Oceanic 815 crash survivors

The Others

Dharma Initiative members

Widmore and employees

Miscellaneous characters

Minor recurring off-island characters

Reception
Entertainment Weekly praised the show's fourth season for its "captivating minor characters (tortured Sayid, scheming Juliet, savvy Ben)". In May 2006, McFarlane Toys announced recurring lines of character action figures and released the first series in November 2006, with the second series being released July 2007.

References

External links
 

Lost